Striated muscle preferentially expressed protein kinase, in the human is encoded by the SPEG gene,  a member of the myosin light chain kinase protein family. SPEG is involved in the development of the muscle cell cytoskeleton, and the expression of this gene has important roles in the development of skeletal muscles, and their maintenance and function. Mutations are associated with centronuclear myopathies a group of congenital disorders where the cell nuclei are abnormally centrally placed.

In the mouse this gene is called SPEG complex locus.
Expression of this gene is thought to serve as a marker for differentiated vascular smooth muscle cells which may have a role in regulating growth and differentiation of this cell type. The encoded protein is highly similar to the corresponding rat and mouse proteins. Multiple alternatively spliced transcript variants have been found for this gene, but the full-length nature of only one variant has been defined.

References

Further reading

External links
 
 

EC 2.7.11